Rosenbergiodendron is a genus of plants in the Rubiaceae. At present (May 2014), it contains 4 recognized species, all native to tropical America.

Rosenbergiodendron densiflorum (K.Schum.) Fagerl. - Jamaica, Trinidad, the Leeward Islands, French Guinea, Guyana, Suriname, Venezuela, Colombia, Brazil 
Rosenbergiodendron formosum (Jacq.) Fagerl.
Rosenbergiodendron formosum var. formosum - Panama, Colombia, Venezuela, Ecuador
Rosenbergiodendron formosum var. nitidum (K.Schum.) C.Gust. - Venezuela
Rosenbergiodendron longiflorum (Ruiz & Pav.) Fagerl - French Guinea, Guyana, Suriname, Venezuela, Colombia, Brazil, Ecuador, Peru, Paraguay
Rosenbergiodendron reflexum C.M.Taylor & Lorence - Peru

References 

Rubiaceae genera
Gardenieae